Muhammad IX (1396–1454), also known by his Arabic and Castilian nicknames Al-Aysar and El Zurdo ("The Left Handed"), was the fifteenth Nasrid ruler of the Emirate of Granada in Al-Andalus on the Iberian Peninsula. He was likely the father of Aixa.

Campaigns of the Reconquista 
After the successful recapturing of the Throne of Granada, the Sultan Muhammad X in 1447, Muhammad IX continued his  policies with regards to the Kingdom of Castile. His predecessor (Muhammad X) had managed to retake a few frontier towns from the Kingdom of Murcia through regular raids. Most of these incursions into Castilian territory were taking advantage of the fact that the contemporary ruling family of the Kingdom of Murcia, the House of Fajardo was preoccupied with internal squabbles. The most successful of these incursions resulted in the capturing of the town of Cieza followed closely by a much celebrated victory at the Battle of Hellín, both of which occurred in 1448.

The continued incursions by the Emirate of Granada into Murcia obliged the Castilian monarch, John II of Castile to ask for a truce in 1450 in order to be able to better concentrate his own forces in a separate war against Juan Pacheco, the Marquis of Villena. Muhammad IX refused the truce offer in a bid to take full advantage of the disunity amongst the Castilian nobility. The following year, in 1451, the Granadan Sultan launched a fresh incursion into the Kingdom of Murcia which brought back much plunder to Granada's coffers. Between 1451 and 1452, Muhammad IX planned a large scale Algara (Arabic for incursion: الغارة) against the area of Campo de Cartagena. This incursion resulted in the capture of 40,000 heads of cattle and around 40 prisoners, mostly pastors.

These Granadan incursions eventually came to a battle at the Battle of Los Alporchones fought near the city of Lorca in 1452. The battle resulted in a Granadan defeat, a truce, and an end to border skirmishes for some time between the kingdoms.

References 

Islamic Spain 1250 to 1500 by Leonard Patrick Harvey; University of Chicago Press, 1992

Sultans of Granada
15th-century monarchs in Europe
1396 births
1454 deaths
15th century in Al-Andalus
15th-century Arabs